Wolf Kahler (born 3 April 1940) is a German stage, film, television, and voice actor.

Since 1975, he appeared in many English language US and UK television and film productions. One of his early roles was Kaiser Wilhelm II in Michael York's adventure film The Riddle of the Sands. One of his most well-known roles was that of Herman Dietrich in Raiders of the Lost Ark.

His voice also appeared in video games including as Kaiser Vlad in Battalion Wars. Kahler played the Prince of Tübingen in Stanley Kubrick's 1975 film, Barry Lyndon. In 2001, he portrayed a Wehrmacht General in the World War II TV miniseries, Band of Brothers. In the 1982 Clint Eastwood spy thriller Firefox, he played KGB chairman Yuri Andropov. In 2011 Kahler appeared as Dr. Hoffmanstahl in Sherlock Holmes: A Game of Shadows. In 2017, he appeared as a German Commander in the Warner Bros./DCEU film Wonder Woman.

Filmography

Film
 1975 Barry Lyndon as Prince of Tübingen 1976 The Eagle Has Landed as SS Hauptsturmführer Fleischer (uncredited)
 1977 March or Die as First German
 1978 Force 10 from Navarone as German Soldier At Supply Dump
 1978 The Boys from Brazil as Schwimmer
 1979 The Riddle of the Sands as Kaiser Wilhelm II
 1979 The Lady Vanishes as Helmut von Reider
 1980 Rough Cut as De Gooyer
 1980 The Sea Wolves as Trompeta
 1981 At the Fountainhead as Wolfgang Leonhard
 1981 Raiders of the Lost Ark as Colonel Hermann Dietrich
 1981 Priest of Love as German Officer
 1982 Firefox as KGB Chairman Andropov
 1982 Remembrance as Dutch Matelot
 1983 High Road to China as Von Hess
 1983 Ascendancy as Muller
 1983 The Keep as SS Adjutant
 1985 A Zed & Two Noughts as Felipe Arc-en-Ciel
 1988 The Bourne Identity as Gold Glasses
 1992 Shining Through as Border Commandant
 1993 The Remains of the Day as German Ambassador
 1994 Backbeat as Bert Kaempfert
 1996 Loch Ness as Dr. Muller
 1997 Firelight as Sussman
 2000 Britannic as Captain Kruger
 2001 The Lost Battalion as General Von Sybel
 2001 Charlotte Gray as Oberleutenant Lindermann
 2004 Bridget Jones: The Edge of Reason as Commentator
 2010 Shanghai as German Consul
 2011 Sherlock Holmes: A Game of Shadows as Dr. Hoffmanstahl
 2012 Full Firearms as Adam
 2012 Cockneys vs Zombies as Nazi Officer
 2017 Wonder Woman as German Commander
 2017 Damascus Cover as Colonel Ludwig Streicher

Short films
 2008 Haber as Erich Ludendorff
 2010 Stasi Dog as The Narrator
 2012 Cold Warrior as Bochinsky
 2016 Millefeuille as Hans-Peter (Opa)
 2016 Rubicon as Dirk Van de Cleef
 2020 Cognition as Dr. Zoger

Television
 1980 Don Siegel: Last of the Independents as himself
 1980 The Sandbaggers as Lincke
 1982 The Secret Adversary as The German
 1982 Hess as Rudolf Hess
 1984 The Adventures of Sherlock Holmes as King of Bohemia
 1985 Space as Funkhauser
 1985 The Dirty Dozen: Next Mission as General Sepp Dietrich
 1987 The Dirty Dozen: The Deadly Mission as Colonel Krieger
 1987 A Perfect Spy as Lieutenant Dollendorf
 1988 War and Remembrance as SS Major Anton Burger
 1992 The Young Indiana Jones Chronicles as German Second At Duel
 1993 Soldier Soldier as Dr. Heller
 1999 Kavanagh QC as Dieter Klausen
 2000 Dalziel and Pascoe as Jurgen Falke
 2001 Band of Brothers as German General
 2001 Red Cap as General Joachim Ulmke
 2004 London as German Traveller
 2005 The Girl in the Café (TV) as Herr Gerhardt
 2006 The Somme - From Defeat to Victory as General Hans von Plessen
 2008 George Gently – Bomber's Moon as Gunter Schmeikel
 2014 Fleming: The Man Who Would Be Bond as Admiral Brandel
 2019 BBC Look North (Yorkshire and North Midlands) as himself

Video games
 1998 Metal Gear Solid as Donald Anderson / Revolver Ocelot / Jim Houseman (German dub)
 1999 Syphon Filter as Thomas Markinson (German dub) 
 2003 Tomb Raider: The Angel of Darkness as Grant Muller
 2004 Half-Life 2 as Dr. Wallace Breen (German dub)
 2005 Battalion Wars as Kaiser Vlad 
 2007 Battalion Wars 2 as Kaiser Vlad / Lord Ferrok
 2008 The Club as Enemy Characters
 2009 IL-2 Sturmovik: Birds of Prey as German Voice
 2010 Kirby's Epic Yarn as The Narrator (German Version)
 2011 Crysis 2 as Karl Ernst Rasch (German & English dub)
 2013 Crysis 3 as Karl Ernst Rasch (German & English dub)
 2013 Company of Heroes 2 as German Announcer
 2015 Calvino Noir as Arno
 2017 Raid: World War II as Dr. Maximillion Reihnhart
 2018 Call of Cthulhu: The Official Video Game as Thomas Fuller
 2019 Close to the Sun as Aubrey King

Thanks
 2012 Raiding the Lost Ark: A Filmumentary (special thanks)

Soundtrack
 2008 Inspector George Gently (performer: The Lambton Worm Song - Episode: "Bomber's Moon")

RadioThe Scarlet Pimpernel of the Vatican'' was first broadcast in 2006 on BBC Radio4. He played Herbert Kappler. This was a drama by Robin Glendinning: a Nazi war criminal is befriended by a Vatican priest in his cell, based on the real-life adventures of Monsignor Hugh O'Flaherty.

References

External links
 

Male actors from Berlin
German male stage actors
German male film actors
German male television actors
20th-century German male actors
21st-century German male actors
Living people
1940 births
German expatriates in England